Ulverston is a civil parish in the South Lakeland District of Cumbria, England. It contains 149 listed buildings that are recorded in the National Heritage List for England.  Of these, five are listed at Grade II*, the middle of the three grades, and the others are at Grade II, the lowest grade.  The parish contains the market town of Ulverston and the surrounding countryside.  A high proportion of the listed buildings are in or near the town centre, and most of these are shops and houses with associated structures.  In the parish is the Ulverston Canal, and there are three listed buildings associated with this.  The other listed buildings include churches, public houses, banks, hotels, civic buildings, an animal pound, memorials, railway stations, and a former drill hall.


Key

Buildings

References

Citations

Sources

Lists of listed buildings in Cumbria
Listed